Cass Township may refer to:

Illinois 

 Cass Township, Fulton County, Illinois

Indiana 

 Cass Township, Clay County, Indiana
 Cass Township, Dubois County, Indiana
 Cass Township, Greene County, Indiana
 Cass Township, LaPorte County, Indiana
 Cass Township, Ohio County, Indiana
 Cass Township, Pulaski County, Indiana
 Cass Township, Sullivan County, Indiana
 Cass Township, White County, Indiana

Iowa 

 Cass Township, Boone County, Iowa
 Cass Township, Cass County, Iowa
 Cass Township, Cedar County, Iowa
 Cass Township, Clayton County, Iowa
 Cass Township, Guthrie County, Iowa
 Cass Township, Hamilton County, Iowa
 Cass Township, Harrison County, Iowa
 Cass Township, Jones County, Iowa
 Cass Township, Shelby County, Iowa 
 Cass Township, Wapello County, Iowa

Missouri 

 Cass Township, Douglas County, Missouri, in Douglas County, Missouri
 Cass Township, Greene County, Missouri
 Cass Township, Stone County, Missouri, in Stone County, Missouri
 Cass Township, Texas County, Missouri

Ohio 

 Cass Township, Hancock County, Ohio
 Cass Township, Muskingum County, Ohio
 Cass Township, Richland County, Ohio

Pennsylvania 

 Cass Township, Huntingdon County, Pennsylvania
 Cass Township, Schuylkill County, Pennsylvania

Township name disambiguation pages